Anthony Leondis (born March 24, 1972) is a Greek-American animator, filmmaker, and voice actor, known for directing The Emoji Movie, Lilo & Stitch 2: Stitch Has a Glitch, and Igor.

Career
Leondis started his career as a story artist working on films such as The Prince of Egypt and The Lion King II: Simba's Pride. He later joined DisneyToon Studios, where he co-wrote the script for Kronk's New Groove. Leondis made his directorial debut on Lilo & Stitch 2: Stitch Has a Glitch in 2005. In 2008, he directed his first theatrical animated film, Igor, for Exodus Film Group.

Since 2009, he was directing at DreamWorks Animation an animated feature film about ghosts, titled B.O.O.: Bureau of Otherworldly Operations. The film, which was based on his original idea, was scheduled to be released in 2015, but by late 2014, it was pulled from DWA's schedule and went back into restructuring. By 2015, Leondis left DreamWorks to develop his next animated film, while B.O.O. is left dead at the studio.

The Emoji Movie
In 2017, Leondis directed and co-wrote Sony Pictures Animation's animated film The Emoji Movie. Leondis pitched the film to the studio and co-wrote it with Eric Siegel.

The film was released on July 28, 2017. Though the film was a box-office success, it was panned by critics. He won two Razzie Awards for Worst Director and Worst Screenplay, the latter he shared with Eric Siegel and Mike White, making him the first animation director in motion picture history to get those categories.

Personal life
Leondis is openly gay.

Filmography

Film

Television

Awards and nominations

References

External links 
 

American male screenwriters
American animated film directors
Animation screenwriters
California Institute of the Arts alumni
American LGBT screenwriters
Animators from New York (state)
LGBT animators
Living people
Writers from New York City
1972 births
LGBT film directors
American gay writers
LGBT people from New York (state)
DreamWorks Animation people
Walt Disney Animation Studios people
American storyboard artists
American male voice actors
Film directors from New York City
Screenwriters from New York (state)
American people of Greek descent
Sony Pictures Animation people